Michał Bartoszak (born 21 June 1970 in Szamotuły) is a former Polish long-distance runner. Bartoszak holds the Polish indoor record in the one mile, outdoor record for 2000 m, and was a national champion in the 1,500 metres. He won the 2003 California International Marathon and competed in the marathon at the 2004 Summer Olympics.

International competitions

Personal bests

Outdoor
1500 metres – 3:38.21 (New Delhi 1991)
One mile – 3:58.96 (Nuoro 1993)
2000 metres – 5:01.7 (Turin 1991)
3000 metres – 7:47.54 (Sopot 1996)
5000 metres – 13:29.72 (Victoria 1992)
10,000 metres – 28:57.26 (Szczecin 2002)
3000 metres steeplechase – 8:22.84 (Hengelo 1996)
5 kilometres – 13:39 (Los Angeles 1993)
10 kilometres – 28:27 (Wręczyca Wielka 2002)
10 miles – 48:19 (Borgholzhausen 2000)
Half marathon – 1:03:35 (Altötting 1999)
Marathon – 2:12:21 (Chicago 1999)

Indoor
1500 metres – 3:43.96 (Paris 1994)
One mile – 3:58.39 (Fairfax 1994)

References

External links
 IAAF profile
 Profile at www.sports-reference.com

1970 births
Living people
Polish male middle-distance runners
Polish male long-distance runners
Athletes (track and field) at the 2004 Summer Olympics
Polish male marathon runners
Olympic athletes of Poland
People from Szamotuły
Sportspeople from Greater Poland Voivodeship
20th-century Polish people
21st-century Polish people